Emilia Kabakov (born 1945) is an American artist born in Dnepropetrovisk, USSR (now Dnipro, Ukraine), whose work is most closely associated with conceptualism and installation art. Since 1988, she has been frequently collaborating with her husband Ilya Kabakov. With the exception of painting, Emilia has shared the credit for all of Ilya's projects since 1997.

Early life and education
Kabakov was born in 1945 in Dnepropetrovsk, Soviet Union. She studied Spanish literature and the Spanish language at Moscow University, and also had studied at the Music College of Irkutsk.

Biography
In 1973 she immigrated to Israel, after which she settled in New York City in 1975 to pursue a career as a gallerist and curator. In 1988 she began collaborating with Ilya Kabakov who is both her husband and her cousin.

Work
Her work has been exhibited at the Tate Modern, the 1993 Venice Biennale, where they represented Russia, the Hirshhorn Museum, the Irish Museum of Modern Art, among many other museum venues. In 2000, the Kabakovs were commissiioned by the Public Art Fund to create a major installation, The Palace of Projects, at the 69th Regiment Armory in New York City consisting of 65 separate projects within a large spiral configuration 80 feet in diameter by 40 feet high.

Collections
Kabakov's work is included in the permanent collections of the Museum of Contemporary Art Antwerp, the British Museum, among others.

References

American women artists
20th-century women artists
21st-century women artists
1945 births
Soviet Nonconformist Art
American installation artists
Artists from Dnipro
Living people
Russian contemporary artists
Ukrainian contemporary artists